Ilamchetchenni (Iḷamcēṭceṉṉi) was an early Tamil king of the Chola dynasty during the Sangam period. He was a great warrior and ruled the Chola kingdom with Uraiyur as the capital. He married a Velir princess from Alundur and their child was Karikala Chola. Ilamchetchenni Chola was succeeded by his son, Karikala Chola, who is considered one of the greatest among the Early Cholas.

Claims 
N.K. Sastri claims that this is the period when the Maurya dynasty established its empire from Persia to southern India.  Bindusara, son of Chandragupta Maurya, conquered much of India besides Kalinga and the Cholas. Fragmentary Sangam poems in the Purananuru state that Ilamchetchenni Cholan successfully resisted Mauryan invasion in the southern region of the Indian subcontinent. Sastri claims that Ilamchetchenni reigned from 501 BCE to 470 BCE, when the Cholas dominated the Chera and Pandya dynasties.

See also
 Early Cholas
 Chola dynasty
 History of India
 History of South India

Notes

References 
 Mudaliar, A.S, Abithana Chintamani (1931), Reprinted 1984 Asian Educational Services, New Delhi.
 Nilakanta Sastri, K.A. (1935). The CōĻas, University of Madras, Madras (Reprinted 1984).
 Nilakanta Sastri, K.A. (1955). A History of South India, OUP, New Delhi (Reprinted 2002).

Chola kings
4th-century BC Indian monarchs